Alex Diego Tejado (born 1 July 1985) is a Mexican former footballer. He currently serves as the manager for Queretaro.

Playing career
Diego joined the Pumas youth system at age 14 and worked his way through the ranks, made the first division team with Pumas when Hugo Sánchez commanded it. He was also a player and captain of the U-20 Mexican team in 2006, but an injury delayed his national team dream. He then played under Miguel España's leadership. In 2006 Diego was loaned to Chiapas, making his first-division debut with them. Then he returned to Pumas where worked hard to get a position, under Tuca Ferretti's leading. A highlight of his career was a goal from about 40 yards out against Tijuana; this was not only the game-winning goal, but a goal that opened doors for the young Mexican. In 2010 Diego was loaned by Pumas to Atlante and in June 2011 is officially transferred. A fast and strong player, he can play right-footed as well as a lefty. He has good field vision to penetrate with long passes. 
Diego retired from professional football at the age of 31 in 2017, and has since taken a managerial role.

Coaching career
He went back to his youth team and coached the Pumas UNAM Under-15 team for 2 years. After a promising track record with the youth teams, he took control of the Pumas Morelos squad in the Mexican Segunda Division. Moving up again, Diego made his way into the Liga Ascenso MX to manage his recently former club, Alebrijes de Oaxaca.

Honors
 Mexican Primera División: (1)
Pumas UNAM
  Clausura 2009

External links
 

1985 births
Living people
Footballers from Mexico City
Liga MX players
Club Universidad Nacional footballers
Chiapas F.C. footballers
Atlante F.C. footballers
Lobos BUAP footballers
Association football midfielders
Association football defenders
Mexican footballers